Treaty of St. Louis may refer to any of the following treaties signed in or near St. Louis by the United States and Native American peoples of the midwest:

Treaty of St. Louis (1804), in which the Sauk and Quashquame ceded territory to the United States
Treaty of St. Louis (1816), in which the Council of Three Fires abandoned their claims to the territory ceded under the Treaty of St. Louis (1804)
Treaty of St. Louis (1818), in which the Osage ceded territory to the United States
Treaty of St. Louis (1825), in which the Shawnee ceded territory to the United States